Çerçili is a village in the Kilis District, Kilis Province, Turkey. The village is inhabited by Kurds and had a population of 430 in 2022.

References

Villages in Kilis District
Kurdish settlements in Kilis Province